Charlie Rouse (April 6, 1924 – November 30, 1988) was an American hard bop tenor saxophonist and flautist. His career is marked by his collaboration with Thelonious Monk, which lasted for more than ten years.

Biography 
Rouse was born in Washington, D.C., United States. At first he  worked with the clarinet, before turning to the tenor saxophone.

Rouse began his career with the Billy Eckstine Orchestra in 1944, followed by the Dizzy Gillespie Big Band in 1945, the Duke Ellington Orchestra from 1949 to 1950, the Count Basie Octet in 1950, Bull Moose Jackson And His Buffalo Bearcats in 1953, and the Oscar Pettiford Sextet in 1955. He made his recording debut with Tadd Dameron in 1947, and in 1957 made a notable album with Paul Quinichette.

He was a member of Thelonious Monk's quartet from 1959 to 1970. In the 1980s he was a founding member of the group Sphere, which began as a tribute to Monk.

Charlie Rouse died from lung cancer on November 30, 1988, at University Hospital in Seattle at the age of 64.

Honors
The asteroid 10426 Charlierouse was officially named to honor Rouse by American astronomer Joe Montani of Spacewatch, who discovered it in 1999. Earlier, in 1994, asteroid 11091 Thelonious had also been discovered and named by Montani.

Discography

As leader
1957: The Chase Is On (Bethlehem) with Paul Quinichette
1958: Just Wailin' (New Jazz) with Herbie Mann, Kenny Burrell and Mal Waldron
1960: Takin' Care of Business (Jazzland)
1960: Yeah! (Epic) – reissued as Unsung Hero in 1990 with tracks from We Paid Our Dues
1961: We Paid Our Dues (Epic) – shared LP with Seldon Powell
1962: Bossa Nova Bacchanal (Blue Note)
1973: Two Is One (Strata-East)
1977: Cinnamon Flower (Casablanca) – also released as Brazil (Douglas Records)
1977: Moment's Notice (Storyville)
1981: The Upper Manhattan Jazz Society (Enja) - released 1985
1984: Social Call (Uptown) with Red Rodney
1988: Soul Mates (Uptown) with Sahib Shihab – released 1993
1988: Epistrophy (Landmark)
With Julius Watkins as Les Jazz Modes/The Jazz Modes
1956: Jazzville Vol. 1 (Dawn) – shared LP with Gene Quill-Dick Sherman Quintet
1956: Les Jazz Modes (Dawn)
1957: Mood in Scarlet (Dawn)
1958: The Most Happy Fella (Atlantic)
1959: The Jazz Modes (Atlantic)
With Sphere
Four in One (Elektra/Musician, 1982)
Flight Path (Elektra/Musician, 1983)
Sphere On Tour (Red, 1985)
Pumpkin's Delight (Red, 1986 [1993])
Four for All (Verve, 1987)
Bird Songs (Verve, 1988)

As sideman
With Dave Bailey
Gettin' Into Somethin' (Epic, 1961)
With Clifford Brown
Memorial Album (Blue Note, 1953)
With Donald Byrd
Byrd in Hand (Blue Note, 1959)
With Benny Carter
Further Definitions (Impulse 1961)
With Sonny Clark
Leapin' and Lopin' (Blue Note 1961)
With Art Farmer
The Art Farmer Septet Prestige, (1953–54)
With Joe Gordon
Introducing Joe Gordon (EmArcy, 1954)
With Bennie Green
Bennie Green Blows His Horn (Prestige, 1955)
Back on the Scene (Blue Note1958)
With Hank Jones
Groovin' High (Muse, 1978)
With Duke Jordan
Les Liaisons Dangereuses (quintet) (Charlie Parker records 1962) 
Duke's Delight (SteepleChase, 1975)
With  Thelonious Monk
At Town Hall (Riverside, 1959)
5 by Monk by 5 (1959)
Thelonious Monk at the Blackhawk (Riverside, 1960)
Monk in France (Riverside, 1961)
Thelonious Monk in Italy (Riverside, 1961 [1963])
Monk in Copenhagen (1961)
Criss Cross (Columbia, 1962)
Monk's Dream (Columbia, 1963)
At Newport 1963 and 1965 (1963, 1965)
Monterey Jazz Festival '63 (1963)
Big Band and Quartet in Concert (Columbia, 1963)
It's Monk's Time (Columbia, 1964)
Monk (Columbia, 1964)
Live at the It Club (Columbia, 1964)
Live at the Jazz Workshop (Columbia, 1964)
Monk In Paris (1965)
Olympia, 6 Mars 1965 (1965)
Olympia, 7 Mars 1965 (1965)
Paris At Midnight (1965)
Straight, No Chaser (Columbia, 1966)
The Nonet – Live! (1967)
Underground (Columbia, 1968)
Palo Alto (recorded 1968, released on Impulse! Records 2020)
Monk's Blues (Columbia 1969)
With Oscar Pettiford
 Oscar Pettiford (Bethlehem, 1954)
With Louis Smith
Smithville (Blue Note, 1958)
With Art Taylor
Taylor's Wailers (Prestige 1957)
Taylor's Tenors (Prestige New Jazz 1959)
With Eddie "Cleanhead" Vinson
Clean Head's Back in Town (Bethlehem, 1957)
With Mal Waldron
The Git Go – Live at the Village Vanguard (Soul Note, 1986)
The Seagulls of Kristiansund (Soul Note, 1986)

References

Bibliography

External links

1924 births
1988 deaths
American jazz tenor saxophonists
American male saxophonists
Hard bop saxophonists
Deaths from lung cancer
Strata-East Records artists
Enja Records artists
Epic Records artists
Blue Note Records artists
Thelonious Monk
20th-century American musicians
20th-century saxophonists
American male jazz musicians
Sphere (American band) members
20th-century American male musicians
Deaths from cancer in Washington (state)
Uptown Records (jazz) artists
Landmark Records artists